The Lonely Hunter (Traditional Chinese: 過客; lit. The Passerby) is a 1981 Hong Kong television drama. Produced by Lee Tim-shing and written by Chan Yiu-ying, The Lonely Hunter is a TVB production. Backed by a star-studded supporting cast and refreshing new artistes, the drama was a ratings hit. The drama also propelled Felix Wong to instant stardom, and it became Wong's first representative work since graduating from TVB's Artiste Acting Class in 1980.

Synopsis
Lee Tong (Felix Wong) grew up with only one intent in mind: revenge. After his gangster father died in the hands of friends Fang and Fong, Tong was raised by his father's henchman, trained to be a lone assassin. Coming of age, he finally sets his plan into action and kills an underworld boss. Timid driver Au-yeung Gong (Michael Miu) unwittingly witnesses the crime but is too scared to rat out Lee, leading to an unexpected friendship. Gong ends up helping Tong enter the organization, laying the path for Tong's revenge. As time passes, Tong's cold and lonely front begins to fade as he experiences life, love, and friendship for the time, but Gong is slowly transformed from a naive youth to a cold-blooded killer.

Cast
Felix Wong
Michael Miu 
Carol Cheng 
Barbara Chan
Shek Sau
Liu Kai-chi
Kwan Hoi-shan
Yeung Kwan

See also
List of TVB series (1981)

TVB dramas
1981 Hong Kong television series debuts
1981 Hong Kong television series endings
Cantonese-language television shows